Sarvabad County is in Kurdistan province, Iran. The capital of the county is the city of Sarvabad. At the 2006 census, the county's population was 53,992 in 12,641 households. The following census in 2011 counted 49,841 people in 13,550 households. At the 2016 census, the county's population was 44,940 in 13,475 households.

Administrative divisions

The population history and structural changes of Sarvabad County's administrative divisions over three consecutive censuses are shown in the following table. The latest census shows two districts, eight rural districts, and two cities.

References

 

Counties of Kurdistan Province